Frederick Crist Trump Jr. (October 14, 1938 – September 26, 1981; nicknamed "Freddy") was an American airplane pilot and maintenance worker. The eldest son to realtor Fred Trump Sr., he fell out of his father's favor when he chose to become an airline pilot. Fred Sr. then chose Fred Jr.'s younger brother Donald to take over the family business.

Early life
Frederick Crist Trump Jr. was born on October 14, 1938, as the first son of wealthy real estate developer Fred Trump and Mary Anne MacLeod Trump in Queens, New York. In 1956 Fred Jr. graduated from St. Paul's School. In that same year his father Fred Sr. donated money to have the playing fields redone and in his honor were renamed Trump Field. Fred Jr. attended Lehigh University and joined a historically Jewish fraternity, Sigma Alpha Mu, even though he was not Jewish. He became president of the fraternity and graduated with a B.A. in business, also completing ROTC and entering the Air National Guard as a second lieutenant.

Pilot career
In 1958, Fred Jr. met Linda Clapp while vacationing in the Bahamas. She later became a stewardess and asked him for help finding an apartment near Idlewild Airport; they soon began dating. He proposed to her in 1961. In early 1962, they were married in Florida, and she resigned from the airline, which did not allow its stewardesses to be married. They settled in Manhattan and had their first child, Frederick Crist Trump III, in November 1962. The next year, they moved into one of Fred Sr.'s apartments in Jamaica, Queens. During this time, Fred Jr. did maintenance jobs on his father's properties. Fred Sr. wanted his oldest son to be "invulnerable" so he could take over his real-estate business, E. Trump & Son, but Fred Jr. was the opposite in personality. In 1966, Fred Jr. was listed in newspapers as vice president of E. Trump & Son, but he had a difficult time working with his father. Fred Jr. left the company to pursue his dream of being a pilot, quickly being accepted at Trans World Airlines, which created tension with his father. According to Fred Jr.'s daughter, Mary L. Trump (born 1965), her grandfather "dismantled him by devaluing and degrading every aspect of his personality." Both Fred Sr. and Donald mocked him for his decision to become an airline pilot, comparing it to driving a bus or being a chauffeur.

Alcoholism and death

By 1970, after a series of domestic incidents, Clapp asked Fred Jr. to leave and arranged for Fred Sr. to change the locks. When his alcoholism prevented him from continuing to function as a pilot, he returned to work for his father's business. He eventually moved into the unfurnished attic of his parents' house, and once again did maintenance on Trump properties. On September 26, 1981, at the age of 42, he died from a heart attack caused by his alcohol use. Donald Trump, who has spoken publicly of his abstinence since 1976, initially cited the formative influence of their father's teetotalism, but later shifted all credit to the adult experience with his brother, claiming:Every day he lectured me, "Look at the mess I'm in. If I ever catch you smoking, you'll be sorry, drinking even a glass of booze because you'll like it too much." ... Freddy did a good job.

In 1999, just after Fred Sr.'s funeral, Fred III's son, William Trump, was born with cerebral palsy. The Trump family agreed to pay for the child's medical expenses. Fred Sr.'s will was revealed, which Donald Trump helped write. It mandated that Fred Jr.'s children, Fred III and Mary, would be excluded from their father's share of Fred Sr.'s inheritance; over $20 million would be divided among Fred Sr.'s other children. Fred III and Mary filed a lawsuit, alleging that Fred Jr.'s siblings, including Donald, used "undue influence" on a dementia-addled Fred Sr. to cut them out of the inheritance. Donald, who later said he "was angry because they sued," suspended the medical benefits for Fred Jr.'s children, as well as Fred III's infant son. According to Mary, she and Fred III sued to have the benefits reinstated, but only her infant nephew received "some accommodations" as a result.

References

Footnotes

Citations

Works cited 

 
 

1938 births
1981 deaths
20th-century American businesspeople
American people of German descent
American people of Scottish descent
Aviators from New York (state)
Businesspeople from New York City
Lehigh University alumni
New York National Guard personnel
People from Jamaica, Queens
People from Queens, New York
Fred Trump Jr.
Alcohol-related deaths in New York City